Adrian Nicholas Matthews Thaws (born 27 January 1968), better known by his stage name Tricky, is a British record producer and rapper. Born and raised in Bristol, south-west England, he began his career as an early member of the band Massive Attack alongside Robert Del Naja, Grant Marshall & Andrew Vowles. He embarked on a solo career with his debut album, Maxinquaye, in 1995. The release won Tricky popular acclaim and marked the beginning of a lengthy collaborative partnership with vocalist Martina Topley-Bird. He released four more studio albums before the end of the decade, including Pre-Millennium Tension and the pseudonymous Nearly God, both in 1996. He has gone on to release nine studio albums since 2000, most recently Fall to Pieces (2020). In 2016, he joined Massive Attack on stage for the first time in two decades while continuing his solo career.

Tricky is a pioneer of trip hop music, and his work is noted for its dark, layered musical style that blends disparate cultural influences and genres, including hip hop, alternative rock and ragga. He has collaborated with a wide range of artists over the course of his career, including Terry Hall, Björk, Gravediggaz, Alanis Morissette, Grace Jones and PJ Harvey.

Early life
Tricky was born in the Knowle West neighbourhood of Bristol, to a Jamaican father and a mixed-race Anglo-Guyanese mother. His mother, Maxine Quaye, died either by suicide or due to epilepsy complications when Tricky was four. His father, Roy Thaws, operated the Studio 17 sound system (formerly known as "Tarzan the High Priest") with his brother Rupert and father Hector. Bristol musician Bunny Marrett claimed in 2012, "It became the most popular sound system in Bristol at the time."

Tricky experienced a difficult childhood in Knowle West, an economically deprived area in Southern Bristol. He became involved in crime at an early age, and joined a gang that was involved in car theft, burglary, fights and promiscuity. Tricky spent his youth in the care of his grandmother, who often let him watch old horror films instead of going to school. At the age of 15, he began to write lyrics ("I like to rock, I like to dance, I like pretty girls taking down their pants", MixMag, 1996). At 17, he spent some time in prison after he purchased forged £50 notes from a friend, who later informed the police. Tricky stated in an interview afterward: "Prison was really good. I'm never going back."

Career

1987–1994: The Wild Bunch, Massive Attack
In the mid-1980s, Tricky met DJ Milo and spent time with a sound system called the Wild Bunch, which by 1987 evolved into Massive Attack. He received the nickname "Tricky Kid" and at the age of 18 became a member of the Fresh 4, a rap group built from the Wild Bunch. He also rapped on Massive Attack's acclaimed debut album Blue Lines (1991).

In 1991, before the release of Massive Attack's album Blue Lines, he met Martina Topley-Bird in Bristol. Some time later she came to his house, and mentioned to Tricky and Mark Stewart that she could sing. Martina was only 15 years old, but her "honey-coated vox" impressed them and they recorded a song called "Aftermath" (although The Face '95 mentions that the first song they recorded together was called "Shoebox"). Tricky showed "Aftermath" to Massive Attack, but they were not interested. So in 1993 he decided to press a few hundred vinyl copies of the song. He cut it directly off the tape, so that the song is basically "just bassline and hiss". (NME 1994). In 1995, a white label got him a contract with Island Records and he started to record his first solo album, Maxinquaye.

1995–2001: Solo breakthrough

Tricky left Massive Attack to release his debut album Maxinquaye, co-produced by himself and Mark Saunders and prominently featuring singer Martina Topley-Bird. The album was successful and Tricky consequently attained international fame, something he was notably uncomfortable with. The Maxinquaye album review by Rolling Stone read: "Tricky devoured everything from American hip-hop and soul to reggae and the more melancholic strains of '80s British rock".

Authors David Hesmondhalgh and Caspar Melville wrote in the book Global Noise: Rap and Hip-Hop Outside the USA: "Tricky showed his debt to hip-hop aesthetics by reconstructualising samples and slices of both the most respected black music (Public Enemy) and the tackiest pop (quoting David Cassidy's "How Can I Be Sure?")." As the Rolling Stone article further explained, Tricky created "a mercurial style of dance music that immediately finds  own fast feet."

Tricky failed to complete a number of lyrics for the Massive Attack album Protection and gave the band some of the lyrics he had written for Maxinquaye instead. Thus, there are songs across the two albums that largely share the same lyrics – entitled "Overcome" and "Hell is 'Round the Corner" on Maxinquaye and "Karmacoma", and "Eurochild" on Protection, respectively. Tricky found it difficult to cope with the huge success of Maxinquaye and subsequently eschewed the laid-back soul sound of the first album to create an increasingly edgy and aggressive punk style of music.

In 1996, Neneh Cherry and Björk appeared as guests on his second album Nearly God. The opening number was a cover of the Siouxsie and the Banshees pre-trip-hop song "Tattoo"
 that had previously inspired Tricky when he forged his style.

In 2001, Tricky appeared on the Thirteen Ghosts soundtrack with the song "Excess" which (briefly) features Alanis Morissette during two of the choruses. In 2002 that song also appeared on the Queen of the Damned soundtrack.

2002–2011: Mixed Race and other work

Tricky's studio album Knowle West Boy was released in the UK and Ireland in July 2008, and September 2008 in the US. The first single from the album was "Council Estate" and features the artist as the sole vocalist: "It's the first single I've ever done with just me on vocals. I couldn't whisper that song. I had to come out of myself and do a loud, screaming vocal. I wanted to be a proper frontman on that one." In an interview with The Skinny in July 2008, Tricky mentioned that Knowle West Boy was the first album for which he decided to enlist a co-producer. Ex-Suede guitarist Bernard Butler was Tricky's initial selection, but, less than enamoured with Butler's technical prowess, Tricky finished the album by totally re-recording all of the material.

On 8 December 2009, Tricky's 1995 debut album Maxinquaye was reissued with a bonus 13-track CD featuring B-sides, outtakes and seven previously unreleased mixes of songs such as "Overcome", "Hell is Round the Corner" and "Black Steel".

In December 2009, the media reported that Massive Attack met Tricky in Paris and asked him to work on a future project—Daddy G said: "Things seem like they've healed between us and Tricky. It's been quite well documented how us and Tricky get on, hasn't it? It's not that well, but things have changed. Things have softened up. We saw Tricky a couple of weeks ago in Paris and it was quite an amicable meeting after five or six years." Tricky agreed to record with the band and he revealed in a June 2013 interview that "there's a couple of songs which are OK, which are really good actually to be honest with you". However, Tricky also stated in June 2013 that he could not spend more than two or three days with Massive Attack and described band member Daddy G as "very arrogant".

Tricky's ninth album Mixed Race was released on 27 September 2010 and the first single from the album became available on 23 August. The album includes contributions from Franky Riley, Terry Lynn, Bobby Gillespie, Hamadouche, Blackman and Tricky's youngest brother Marlon Thaws.

In June 2011, Tricky's then label Brownpunk signed on Mexican band My Black Heart Machine for one single, "It Beats Like This", which Tricky co-produced. My Black Heart Machine was then commissioned by the label to cover a song from Maxinquaye for an album of covers by Brownpunk's roster; the band chose "Hell Is Round the Corner". "It Beats Like This" was released independently by the band on their first EP in April 2013.

Tricky produced rapper Omni's album IamOmni (produced by Tricky) (released under the moniker IamOmni) that was available from 30 August 2011 as a free download on Omni's official site.

2011–present: False Idols, live events, Ununiform
On 26 June 2011, Tricky appeared on stage during Beyoncé's headline slot on the pyramid stage at Glastonbury for the track "Baby Boy". Partly the result of technical difficulties with his microphone, he later stated he was "mortified" by his own performance, saying, "I've never been so embarrassed. My body just froze".

In April 2012, Tricky performed Maxinquaye with Martina Topley-Bird at several concerts around the UK including, for the first time in several years in his home town of Bristol. The concerts featured regular interruptions orchestrated by Tricky, where he brought his youngest brother, Marlon Thaws to rap on stage alongside other local rappers as well as encouraging the audience to come up on stage. The review of the concert in Manchester said it was "shambolic" and a "car crash" with Tricky often leaving the stage and continuously forgetting his words, leaving Topley Bird to carry the delivery of the tracks, resulting in many leaving early after repeated issues with Tricky's behaviour and shouts of "wanker" from the crowd.

In February 2013, Tricky announced the release of a new album, False Idols. The album is the follow up from his 2010 Mixed Race and featured Peter Silberman, Fifi Rong and Nneka. Tricky released this statement about the album:
"This new album I'll stand behind every track. I don't care whether people like it. I'm doing what I want to do, which is what I did with my first record. That's what made me who I was in the beginning. If people don't like it, it don't matter to me because I'm back where I was."

In spring 2014, it was announced that Tricky is to perform at a number of festivals throughout Europe over the summer of 2014, including Control Day Out in Romania, festival Couleur Café in Belgium, Positivus Festival in Latvia and Galtres Parklands Festival in England, the latter of which he co-headlines with contemporaries Morcheeba.

Tricky announced a new album titled Adrian Thaws in June 2014. It was released on 8 September 2014. Skilled Mechanics was released in January 2016. The same month was released a song Tricky had written with 3D from Massive Attack, on the band's EP Ritual Spirit.

His thirteenth official studio album, ununiform, was released on 22 September 2017, and featured collaborations with Asia Argento, Avalon Lurks, and Martina Topley-Bird, as well as a cover of Hole's "Doll Parts". Polish singer Marta Złakowska joined Tricky's band on a 2017 tour as a guest singer. She stepped in at the last minute when the originally planned singer dropped out.

Blink, an imprint of Bonnier Books UK, has acquired Tricky's autobiography. Commissioning Editor Kerri Sharp acquired World rights from K7 Music – the independent music company headquartered in Berlin, where Tricky now lives. The book is currently untitled and will sell as a £20 Hardback in October 2019.

His EP 20,20 was released on 6 March 2020. It featured the song Lonely Dancer recorded with the female singer Anika. She had previously worked with Beak in 2010. Tricky's next album, Fall to Pieces, was released in September 2020. The album featured singers Marta and Oh Land.

In October 2021, Tricky released a new album under the artist name 'Lonely Guest'. The self-titled album featured collaborations with Lee "Scratch" Perry, Idles' frontman Joe Talbot and Maxïmo Park’s Paul Smith. It featured songs with previous album vocalists Marta and Oh Land.

Side projects and film career
Tricky has guest-starred on a number of albums, including an appearance on Live's fifth studio album, V. This appearance came as Tricky and Live's lead singer Ed Kowalczyk had developed a close friendship, with Kowalczyk contributing vocals to 'Evolution Revolution Love', a track on Tricky's album Blowback.

Tricky has also acted in various films. He appeared in a significant supporting role in the 1997 Luc Besson film The Fifth Element, playing the right-hand man "Right Arm" to evil businessman Mr. Zorg.

He also appears briefly in the 2004 Olivier Assayas film Clean, playing himself, and had a large role in the music video for "Parabol/Parabola" by Tool. He was also rumoured to have a brief cameo in John Woo's 1997 movie Face/Off, but has denied that this was the case, although his single "Christiansands" was featured in the movie. Tricky also appeared as Finn, a musician who loves and then dumps main character Lynn, in the US sitcom, Girlfriends.

In 2001, Tricky appeared in online advertising for the web series We Deliver, about a cannabis delivery service in New York City. Though he did not appear in any episodes, in the advertising it appears as if he is a customer of the service.

The launch of a record label entitled "Brown Punk" was announced in mid-2007 that was a collaboration between Tricky and former Island Records executive Chris Blackwell. At the time, Tricky said: "Brown Punk represents a positive movement where you find intellectuals mixing with the working class, rock mixing with reggae and indie mixing with emo." The Dirty, The Gospel, Laid Blak Mexican band My Black Heart Machine were acts that were signed to the label, but as of October 2013, the label appears to be inactive.

In March 2023, the album When It's Going Wrong was released on False Idol. It is a collaboration between Tricky and Marta; the singer he had worked with since 2017.

Idiosyncrasies and media issues

By the time Pre-Millennium Tension was released in 1996, Tricky was increasingly irritated with the British press, particularly articles written in The Face magazine. The Face had been an early champion of Maxinquaye, but saw Tricky as more a duo than a solo project. The Face published an article claiming that vocalist Martina Topley-Bird had to single-handedly bring up the child that Tricky had fathered.

Tricky has also been concerned with racial stereotyping of the media. In the documentary Naked & Famous, he stated that photographers wanted him to frown angrily in photos. He points to a cover of The Big Issue, where he has a milder look on his face, as being more representative of how he feels. In the song "Tricky Kid" from Pre-Millennium Tension, he wrote: "As long as you're humble/Let you be the king of jungle".

Throughout his work, he blurs the normally clear gender definitions found in hip-hop. Despite the heavy influence he drew from American hip-hop in his debut album, Maxinquaye, he fights against typical gender representations by, for example, dressing as a woman on the side sleeve of his album cover. As many of his tracks blend elements of varying types of music creating a difficult-to-define sound, so do his lyrics, creating a more ambiguous and blurry take on gender and sexuality.

Personal life
Tricky has stated that he has "been through a lot... I've been moved around from family to family, never stayed in one house from when I was born to the age of 16. ...I'm not normal. It's got a lot to do with my upbringing....Staying somewhere for three years then going off for three years. My uncles being villains. All that stuff. I've got quite a dysfunctional family....for some reason, in my family, the mothers always give the kids to the grandmothers".

Tricky has fourteen paternal siblings.

He was in a brief relationship with Icelandic singer-songwriter Björk in the 1990s. When asked in mid-2013 about the time the pair spent together, Tricky stated: "I wasn't good for Björk. I wasn't healthy for her. I feel she was really good to me, she gave me a lot of love and she really was a good person to me. I think she cared about me, right?" He was also briefly married to Carmen Ejogo in early 1998 in Las Vegas.

Tricky fathered a daughter, Mina Mazy, on 19 March 1995 with Martina Topley-Bird, a musician he discovered when she was sitting on a wall near his Bristol home.  Mina struggled with depression and took her own life on 8 May 2019.  Following her death, Tricky stated "It feels like I’m in a world that doesn’t exist, knowing nothing will ever be the same again.  No words or text can really explain, my soul feels empty."

In 2015, Tricky moved to live in Berlin, Germany.

Discography

Studio albums

Singles and EPs

1993–2000

2001–present

See also
List of trip hop artists

References

Bibliography
Chemam, Melissa, Massive Attack: Out of the Comfort Zone, Tangent Books (2019) , 
Tricky, Hell Is Around The Corner, Blink Publishing (2019)

External links

 
 

Living people
1968 births
Black British male actors
Black British male rappers
British trip hop musicians
English male film actors
English male television actors
English people of Guyanese descent
English people of Jamaican descent
English male rappers
English record producers
Musicians from Bristol
Male actors from Bristol
Massive Attack members
20th-century British rappers
English expatriates in Germany
21st-century British rappers
20th-century British male musicians
21st-century British male musicians
Domino Recording Company artists
Anti- (record label) artists
Epitaph Records artists